, or Nyūdō Saki Lighthouse,  is a lighthouse on the northwest top of Oga Peninsula in the city of Oga, Akita Prefecture, Japan.

History 
The first lighthouse was built in 1898, a white hexagon 24.4 meter steel tower. It was electrified with a 1,500W lamp in 1932 and manned until 1972, when it transitioned to automatic control. From 1973 Nyudozaki carries a continuous white spotlight that shines on the Mizushima Islet about 1,000 meters to the north. It is currently one of the 16 Japanese lighthouses which is open to the public, who may climb to the top for a panoramic view over the Sea of Japan (not available in winter season).  A small museum has been attached since 1998 displaying references and lenses. The tower is listed as one of the “50 Lighthouses of Japan” by the Japan Lighthouse Association and operated by the 2nd Regional Coast Guard Headquarters.

Gallery

See also

 List of lighthouses in Japan
 Oga Aquarium Gao
 Oga Quasi-National Park

References

Lighthouses completed in 1898
Lighthouses in Japan
Buildings and structures in Akita Prefecture
1898 establishments in Japan
Oga, Akita